James S. A. Corey is the pen name used by collaborators Daniel Abraham and Ty Franck, authors of the science fiction series The Expanse.  The first and last name are taken from Abraham's and Franck's middle names, respectively, and S. A. are the initials of Abraham's daughter. The name is also meant to emulate many of the space opera writers of the 1970s. In Germany, their books are published under the name James Corey with the middle initials omitted.

Career
Under the pen name James S. A. Corey, fantasy author Daniel Abraham began to collaborate with Ty Franck (who had worked as a personal assistant to George R. R. Martin) in 2011. Together they wrote Leviathan Wakes (2011), the first science fiction novel in the series The Expanse. Leviathan Wakes was nominated for the 2012 Hugo Award for Best Novel and the 2012 Locus Award for Best Science Fiction Novel. The authors began to release other novels in the series including Caliban's War (2012), Abaddon's Gate (2013), Cibola Burn (2014), Nemesis Games (2015), Babylon's Ashes (2016), and Persepolis Rising (2017). Abaddon's Gate won the Locus Award. Orbit Books signed the authors to write additional books in the Expanse series to bring the total to nine. The eighth book in the series, Tiamat's Wrath, was released on March 26, 2019. The final installment, Leviathan Falls, was reportedly turned in to the publisher on May 17, 2021, and was released on November 30, 2021.

The Expanse series was nominated for the Hugo Award for Best Series in 2017 and won in 2020.

Between each pair of full-length books, they published shorter works in the series. The first, a short story entitled The Butcher of Anderson Station: A Story of The Expanse was released as an eBook in October 2011. A 69-page novella, Gods of Risk followed, and was released as an eBook in September 2012. A short story entitled Drive was released in November 2012 as a part of the anthology Edge of Infinity. Another novella, The Churn, was released April 29, 2014, and other novellas have followed. All are set in The Expanse series.

The authors have also written a Star Wars novel, Honor Among Thieves, published by Random House in 2014, and a short story unrelated to The Expanse titled A Man Without Honor, included in the anthology Old Mars, edited by George R. R. Martin.

Bibliography

The Expanse series

 Leviathan Wakes (June 15, 2011) 
 Caliban's War (June 26, 2012)
 Abaddon's Gate (June 4, 2013)
 Cibola Burn (June 5, 2014)
 Nemesis Games (June 2, 2015)
 Babylon's Ashes (December 6, 2016)
 Persepolis Rising (December 5, 2017)
 Tiamat's Wrath (March 26, 2019)
 Leviathan Falls (November 30, 2021)

Related works 
 The Butcher of Anderson Station (An Expanse short story) (2011)
 Gods of Risk (An Expanse novella) (2012)
 Drive (An Expanse short story) (2012)
 The Churn (An Expanse novella) (2014)
 The Vital Abyss (An Expanse novella) (2015)
 Strange Dogs (An Expanse novella) (2017)
 The Last Flight of the Cassandra (An Expanse short story) (2019)
 Auberon (An Expanse novella) (2019)
 The Sins of Our Fathers (An Expanse novella) (2022)
 Memory's Legion (A collection of Expanse short stories) (2022)

Other novels
 Honor Among Thieves (Star Wars: Empire and Rebellion, book 2) (2014)

Short fiction 
 "A Man Without Honor", Old Mars, eds. George R. R. Martin and Gardner Dozois (2013)
 "Silver and Scarlet" (Star Wars story), Star Wars Insider No. 148 (2014)
 "The Drones", Popular Science (2015)
 "Rates of Change", Meeting Infinity, ed. Jonathan Strahan (2015)
 "The Hunger After You're Fed", Wired (2016)

References

External links

 James S. A. Corey official website
 Lizard Brain – blog shared by Abraham and Franck
 
 
 Daniel Abraham and Ty Franck at LC Authorities

21st-century American male writers
21st-century American novelists
American male novelists
American science fiction writers
Hugo Award-winning writers
Living people
Science fiction shared pseudonyms
Year of birth missing (living people)